In computational fluid dynamics, the MacCormack method is a widely used discretization scheme for the numerical solution of hyperbolic partial differential equations. This second-order finite difference method was introduced by Robert W. MacCormack in 1969. The MacCormack method is elegant and easy to understand and program.

The algorithm 
The MacCormack method is a variation of the two-step Lax–Wendroff scheme but is much simpler in application. To illustrate the algorithm, consider the following first order hyperbolic equation

The application of MacCormack method to the above equation proceeds in two steps; a predictor step which is followed by a corrector step. 

The above equation is obtained by replacing the spatial and temporal derivatives in the previous first order hyperbolic equation using forward differences.

Corrector step: In the corrector step, the predicted value  is corrected according to the equation 

Note that the corrector step uses backward finite difference approximations for spatial derivative.

Replacing the  term by the temporal average

to obtain the corrector step as

Some remarks 
The MacCormack method is well suited for nonlinear equations (Inviscid Burgers equation, Euler equations, etc.) The order of differencing can be reversed for the time step (i.e., forward/backward followed by backward/forward). For nonlinear equations, this procedure provides the best results. For linear equations, the MacCormack scheme is equivalent to the Lax–Wendroff method.

Unlike first-order upwind scheme, the MacCormack does not introduce diffusive errors in the solution. However, it is known to introduce dispersive errors (Gibbs phenomenon) in the region where the gradient is high.

See also 
Lax–Wendroff method
Upwind scheme
Hyperbolic partial differential equations

References

Computational fluid dynamics
Numerical differential equations